My Reality is the sixth studio album by Australian singer Dami Im, released on 29 October 2021. It is her first album released on ABC Music.

Background and release
In 2013, Im became the winner of the fifth season of The X Factor Australia and subsequently received a contract with Sony Music Australia. Between 2013 and 2018, Im released four studio albums with Sony, all of which peaked within the ARIA top ten. In 2019 Im won the Australian Women in Music Awards Humanitarian Award.

On 31 August 2020, Im confirmed she had signed with ABC Music and announced a new album was scheduled for 2021.

On 8 October 2021, Im released "Pray" and announced her sixth studio album My Reality. Upon announcement, Im said "A few years ago I wasn't mature enough to steer my albums the way I wanted them to go. This is the dream album, it took a while but I'm so proud of it. This album is about owning who I am. You shouldn't shy away from the things people like about you. But you are who you are. Some parts on this record people might expect, some others show how much I've changed. With this album I'm just trying to be authentic in the way I know it, that's my reality."

Reception

David from auspOp gave the album 4 out of 5, saying, "My Reality revealing a more honest and genuine side to Dami... Across the album, Dami has co-written all the songs, which means the lyrics are deeply personal and mean a lot more to her than ever before." David called "Paper Dragon" the highlight.

Track listing

Charts

Release history

References

2021 albums
Dami Im albums